Zohar Manna (1939 – 30 August 2018) was an Israeli-American computer scientist who was a professor of computer science at Stanford University.

Biography 
He was born in Haifa, Israel. He earned his Bachelor of Science (BS) and Master of Science (MS) degrees from the Technion – Israel Institute of Technology.

He attended Carnegie Mellon University and earned his Doctor of Philosophy (PhD) in computer science in 1968.

Manna returned to Israel in 1972 as a professor of applied mathematics at the Weizmann Institute of Science. He became a full professor at Stanford in 1978. He remained affiliated with the Weizmann Institute of Science until 1995. He continued to work as a Stanford professor until retirement in 2010.

Books 
He authored nine books. The Mathematical Theory of Computation (McGraw Hill, 1974; reprinted Dover, 2003) is one of the first texts to provide extensive coverage of the mathematical concepts behind computer programming.

With Amir Pnueli, he co-authored an unfinished trilogy of textbooks on temporal logic and verification of reactive systems: The Temporal Logic of Reactive and Concurrent Systems: Specification (Springer-Verlag, 1991), The Temporal Logic of Reactive and Concurrent Systems: Safety (Springer-Verlag, 1995) and The Temporal Logic of Reactive and Concurrent Systems: Progress (unpublished; first three chapters posted at http://theory.stanford.edu/~zm/tvors3.html).

With Aaron R. Bradley he co-authored a textbook, The Calculus of Computation, that serves as an introduction to both first-order logic and formal verification.

Awards 
In 1994, he was inducted as a Fellow of the Association for Computing Machinery. In 2016, he shared the Herbrand Award with Richard Waldinger for his ″pioneering research and pedagogical contributions (with Richard Waldinger) to automated reasoning, program synthesis, planning, and formal methods″. He received the Bauer Prize from the Technical University of Munich, and an honorary doctorate from the École Normale Supérieure de Cachan.

Advising 
He supervised 30 doctoral students, including Nachum Dershowitz, Adi Shamir, Thomas Henzinger, Pierre Wolper, and Martín Abadi.

See also
 Temporal logic
 Reactive systems
 Concurrency (computer science)

References

External links

1939 births
2018 deaths
People from Haifa
Stanford University School of Engineering faculty
Fellows of the Association for Computing Machinery
Carnegie Mellon University alumni